
HSV may refer to:

Computing 
 HSL and HSV color space, which describes colors by hue, saturation, and lightness (or luminosity)

Virology 
 Herpes simplex virus (HSV) spreads in skin contact with skin and herpes wounds on the skin; transmitted by kissing

Places 
 Huntsville, Alabama, United States
 Huntsville International Airport

Sport 
 Hamburger SV, a German football club
 HSV Handball, a German handball club in Hamburg
 Hannover 96, or  Hannoverscher Sportverein von 1896, a German football club

Other uses 
 HSV (TV station) broadcasting in Melbourne, Australia
 High-speed vessel
 Hennessey Special Vehicles, a recently established American automobile division by Hennessey
 Holden Special Vehicles, an Australian automobile manufacturer